The Japanese Garden is part of Ashland, Oregon's Lithia Park, in the United States.

Description and history
The  garden was designed by landscape architect John McLaren in 1915. In 2018, a $1.3 million grant was intended to improve the garden's authenticity. The garden's redesign was put on hold in January 2019, following criticism over the potential removal of two century-old Douglas firs planted by Boy Scouts.

References

External links

 Japanese Garden Design Evaluation at the City of Ashland
 Lithia Park Japanese Garden – Ashland, OR at Waymarking

1915 establishments in Oregon
Ashland, Oregon
Gardens in Oregon
Japanese gardens in the United States